Turkish Argentines are Argentine citizens of full or partial Turkish ancestry. In 2015, The International Organization for Migration (IOM) estimated that there are 635 Turkish immigrants residing in Argentina.

History and culture 
The Turkish community is small and mainly descended from Turks who arrived during the Great Immigration in Argentina in the late 19th century and early 20th century from the then Ottoman Empire, mainly during World War I. Another second wave arrived during World War II. Some third generation descendants are fluent in Turkish. The community, which is very active, is usually seen at the Immigrant's Day celebration in Buenos Aires, thanks to an invitation from the National Migration Directorate.

Most of the immigrants arriving since the Ottoman Empire were Arabs (mainly Syrians and Lebanese), while another number were Sephardic Jews and Armenians. Despite this, the Arab-Argentines are mistakenly nicknamed Turks. An example of this is the nickname of the former president Carlos Saúl Menem. This is due to the arrival of immigrants they were noted as "Turkish-Ottomans", appearing in the same way in the first Argentine censuses. In 1914, the "Turkish-Ottomans" represented 1.9% of the foreign population, being the fifth largest immigration.

At the beginning of the 1900s, a Turkish-Ottoman neighborhood was developed in the Catalinas Norte area of ​​the Buenos Aires neighborhood of Retiro, which stretched for 200 meters above the Reconquista Street. The sector concentrated most of the 8,000 Ottomans in Buenos Aires. Many of them were merchants and had their own newspaper and bar. 

One of the Turkish cultural associations is the "Fundación de la Amistad Argentino Turca", which offers classes in Turkish language and  Arabic, as well as Turkish cuisine and Islam. Since 2006, the small community that resides in Buenos Aires has had the Hercules School (part of the foundation and located on Bogotá Street at 4300, in the Buenos Aires neighborhood of  Flores). There is also a Turkish food restaurant in the same city.

Notable people
• Salt Bae, Turkish chef and businessman, lived in Argentina in late 2000s for several years as a traveling learning chef.

References 

Asian Argentine
Ethnic groups in Argentina
Argentina